Sud de France Arena  (also known as the Arena Montpellier) is an indoor arena located in the Montpellier suburb of Pérols, in the south of France that opened in September 2010. It has a seating capacity of 14,000 spectators, with near 10,000 for sporting events.

Notable events
The stadium hosted the Violetta Live International Tour, recording the video clips of the concert that are now published. It will host the European matches of Montpellier Handball and the Open Sud de France tennis tournament. It also hosted the XXXI World Rhythmic Gymnastics Championships which served as a qualification process for the 2012 Summer Olympics. The arena hosted the 2015 European Artistic Gymnastics Championships on April 13–19.

It hosted a group of the FIBA EuroBasket 2015, and some matches of the 2017 World Men's Handball Championship.

In 2021, the arena hosted the UCI Urban Cycling World Championships.

In March 2022, it hosted the World Figure Skating Championships.

See also
 List of indoor arenas in France

References

External links

 

Indoor arenas in France
Basketball venues in France
Handball venues in France
Sports venues in Montpellier
Sports venues completed in 2010
21st-century architecture in France